Nerone, an Italian name derived from the word "nero" meaning "black", may refer to:

 Nerone, the Italian form of the name of the Roman emperor Nero
 Nerone (rapper) (born 1991), Italian rapper
 Nerone (1909 film), a film directed by Luigi Maggi and Arturo Ambrosio 
 Nerone (1930 film), a comedy film starring Ettore Petrolini
 Nerone (1977 film), a comedy film starring Pippo Franco
 Nerone (Boito), an opera by Arrigo Boito
 Nerone (Duni), an opera by Egidio Romualdo Duni
 Nerone (Mascagni), an opera by Pietro Mascagni
 Néron (opera), an opera by Anton Rubinstein
 Monte Nerone, a mountain in the Umbrian Apennines of central Italy
 Torre di Nerone, part of the German Gothic Line of the Italian Campaign of World War II

See also 
 L'incoronazione di Poppea, a 1643 opera by Claudio Monteverdi in which Nerone (Emperor Nero) is the principal male character
 Neron (disambiguation)
 Nerone fatto Cesare, an opera by Antonio Vivaldi